26 Engineer Regiment is a regiment of the British Army's Royal Engineers. It is based at Swinton Barracks, Salisbury Plain, Wiltshire.

History 

The unit was formed in 1950 and in April 1956 moved to 4th Armoured Division in the same role. In November 1957, the regiment was reorganised and re-titled as "Headquarters Royal Engineers, 4th Division" and moved to Paderborn, Germany. By 1969, it was expanded in size and in 1970, the regiment moved to Iserlohn. From July to November 1974, the regiment was tasked as an infantry unit and served in Northern Ireland. By 1978, the regiment was reorganised again as the new 3rd Armoured Division's Armoured Engineer Regiment. The Regiment reformed in 2000 with 38 HQ and Support Squadron and 8 Armd Engr Sqn and from August to February of the same year the regiment served as part of Kosovo Force.  When the regiment came back from operations it moved to Horne Barracks, Larkhill, but later moved to Corunna Barracks Ludgershall.  The regiment served in both Operation Telic and Operation Herrick,  namely TELIC VI, HERRICK VI and HERRICK XVI.  In January 2009 the regiment moved to Swinton Barracks at Perham Down.

Under Army 2020 the regiment moved to 25 (Close Support) Engineer Group.

Organization 
Its structure is as follows:

 26 Engineer Regiment, in Swinton Barracks
 38 Headquarters and Support Squadron
 8 Armoured Engineer Squadron
 30 Armoured Engineer Squadron
 33 Armoured Engineer Squadron

References

External links

 
Regiments of the Royal Engineers
Military units and formations established in 2000